Shirley High School is a co-educational academy school in the London Borough of Croydon, which first opened in 1954. The school has around 1100 pupils aged 11–18. The school was awarded specialist status as a performing arts college.  The school opened a sixth form block for the 2014–2015 academic year.

Alumni 

 Jamal Blackman, footballer
 Ashley Mckenzie, Olympic athlete (judo)
 Ethan Pinnock, footballer

References

External links 
Official website
Ofsted inspection reports
Performance tables (Department for Education and Skills)

Academies in the London Borough of Croydon
Educational institutions established in 1954
Secondary schools in the London Borough of Croydon
1954 establishments in England
Specialist arts colleges in England